Ray T. Sheppard (December 10, 1902 - October 24, 1987) was an American professional baseball shortstop and third baseman in the Negro leagues. He played with several teams from 1924 to 1932, playing mostly for the Birmingham Black Barons and the Detroit Stars.

References

External links
 and Seamheads

Indianapolis ABCs players
Cleveland Browns (baseball) players
Birmingham Black Barons players
Detroit Stars players
Detroit Wolves players
Monroe Monarchs players
1902 births
1987 deaths
Baseball shortstops
Baseball third basemen
Baseball players from Texas
20th-century African-American sportspeople